Sir William Hamilton of Sanquhar (c. 1510–1570) was pursemaster for James V and the Captain of Edinburgh Castle during the Regency of Regent Arran.

William Hamilton was the son of William Hamilton, also of Sanquhar, and Katherine Kennedy, a daughter of David Kennedy, 1st Earl of Cassilis.

He was first known as Hamilton of MacNaristoun, and was appointed pursemaster to James V of Scotland in September 1524.

Hamilton travelled to France as a diplomat and in September 1528 brought back letters from Francis I of France co-signed by the secretary Florimond Robertet, showing that Francis was mindful of the 1517 Treaty of Rouen and would persuade the Duke of Albany to give up Dunbar Castle and would try to prevent Albany's return to Scotland.

As Captain of Edinburgh Castle from 1 October 1548, in April 1549, Hamilton took delivery of 24 halberds. His annual fee for being Captain was £134-6s-8d. Scots.

An inventory of Sir William's furniture at Newton Castle near Ayr, made in 1559 during a legal action, is notable for its description of furniture. It mentions cupboards and a door made in the "courtly manner" and "raised and carved work of the most recent and curious fashion used within the realm". Another inventory of 1588 shows that some of the same furniture was still in place. The gardens and orchard had hawthorn hedges, gooseberry and currant bushes, roses, apple trees, plum trees, and cherry trees. There were also areas with kale and herbs.

Marriage and family
Hamilton married Jean Campbell. His children included:
 Isobel Hamilton (died 1604), who married George Seton, 7th Lord Seton in  1550. Hamilton paid £2,000 for the ward and marriage right of the young Lord Seton. The wedding was celebrated with a feast at Edinburgh Castle on 12 August 1550 paid for by Regent Arran. Richard Maitland wrote that Hamilton helped Lord Seton rebuild Seton Palace, which had been damaged by the English army that burnt Edinburgh in May 1544.
 William Hamilton of Glenmoor. In December 1551 Regent Arran gave him the substantial sum of £53 Scots for clothes.

References
 Ross Mackenzie, A Scottish Renaissance Household: Sir William Hamilton and Newton Castle in 1559 (Darvel, 1990). This presents the inventory in the National Records of Scotland, CS7/20, fol. 108ff.

16th-century Scottish people
Court of James V of Scotland
Senators of the College of Justice
People from Sanquhar
1510 births
1570 deaths
Year of birth uncertain